No. 169 Squadron RAF was a tactical reconnaissance and later a night intruder squadron of the Royal Air Force during World War II.

History
No. 169 squadron was formed on 15 June 1942 at RAF Twinwood Farm as a tactical reconnaissance squadron from 'B' flight of 613 Squadron, and took over their North American Mustang Mk.Is. The squadron moved to RAF Duxford in December 1942 and began coastal reconnaissance and ground attack missions. The squadron disbanded at RAF Middle Wallop on 30 September 1943, only to reform again the following day at RAF Ayr as a night intruder squadron flying de Havilland Mosquitoes and a single Bristol Beaufighter, while the squadron also had some Airspeed Oxfords on strength for training and communication.

In December 1943, the squadron joined No. 100 Group at Little Snoring. The squadron re-equipped with Mosquito II night fighters in January 1944 and commenced night intruder operations against German night fighters. The squadron disbanded on 10 August 1945 at RAF Great Massingham.

Notable squadron member
 Keith Miller

Aircraft operated

References

Citations

Bibliography

 Bowyer, Michael J.F. and John D.R. Rawlings. Squadron Codes, 1937–56. Cambridge, UK: Patrick Stephens Ltd., 1979. .
 Flintham, Vic and Andrew Thomas. Combat Codes: A full explanation and listing of British, Commonwealth and Allied air force unit codes since 1938. Shrewsbury, Shropshire, UK: Airlife Publishing Ltd., 2003. .
 Halley, James J. The Squadrons of the Royal Air Force & Commonwealth 1918–1988. Tonbridge, Kent, UK: Air Britain (Historians) Ltd., 1988. .
 Hamlin, John F. The Oxford, Consul & Envoy File. Tunbridge Wells, Kent, UK: Air-Britain (Historians) Ltd., 2001. .
 Jefford, C.G. RAF Squadrons, a Comprehensive record of the Movement and Equipment of all RAF Squadrons and their Antecedents since 1912. Shrewsbury, Shropshire, UK: Airlife Publishing, 1988 (second edition 2001). .
 Rawlings, John D.R. Coastal, Support and Special Squadrons of the RAF and their Aircraft. London: Jane's Publishing Company Ltd., 1982. .
 Rawlings, John D.R. Fighter Squadrons of the RAF and their Aircraft. London: Macdonald & Jane's (Publishers) Ltd., 1969 (2nd edition 1976, reprinted 1978). .

External links
 History of No.'s 166–170 Squadrons at RAF Web

169
Military units and formations established in 1942